Sayre Public Schools is a school district serving the cities of Sayre and Elk City in Oklahoma. It includes the following schools:

 Sayre Elementary School
 Sayre Middle School
 Sayre High School

In 1994–5, the district was the defendant in a liability suit eventually decided by the Supreme Court of Oklahoma.

Superintendent                                    Danny Crabb

High School Principal (9th-12th)         Brad Coffman

Middle School Principal (6th-8th)       Jason Bohannon

Elementary Principal (3rd-5th)            Smith Steigleder

Early Childhood Principal (PK-2nd)     Krista Holland

References

External links
 Sayre Public Schools

School districts in Oklahoma
Education in Beckham County, Oklahoma